, better known by his stage name Masonna, is a Japanese noise musician. He was born  on November 16, 1966, in Miyazu, Kyoto, Japan.

 was started in 1987 in Osaka as Maso Yamazaki's noise project. It is also a pun on the name of the pop singer Madonna.

Maso also performs as Space Machine using vintage analog synthesizers. He has performed with the psychedelic rock group Christine 23 Onna (with Fusao Toda of Angel'in Heavy Syrup), which then became Acid Eater with the addition of two members, as well as the noise supergroup Bustmonster and the noise trio Flying Testicle.

In 2018, Maso began performing and releasing under the name Controlled Death.

History
Maso has said that he became interested in making noise music when he heard the sounds of destruction on television as a child, but that his first exposure to the Japanese noise genre was Hanatarash's debut LP, which at the time did not impress Maso. It was however later, upon happening on an LP entitled LSD by a Tokyo noise band named Nord, and mistakenly thinking it was an album by the band LSD, that these experiences had possibly kindled his future interest. A year thereafter Maso sought many different types of noise releases in the underground music stores in and around Osaka Japan. Two years would pass until Maso would start to develop his own style of noise and begin producing, at which time he quit listening to the noise albums of others and focused in on his own unique style. Previous to his interest in noise Maso played guitar in several bands, one of which he states in interviews was a Led Zeppelin cover band, playing the occasional Deep Purple song.

All of Maso's projects draw heavily from the psychedelic music scene in outward style, but sonically most of them resemble very few of the traits of late 1960s and 1970s psychedelic music. Maso has an interest in avant-garde films, having stated in interviews that his two favorite movies are the Alexandro Jodorowsky films The Holy Mountain and El Topo. He also claims to admire and had the wish to have worked with American musician Captain Beefheart.

The Masonna project has been the opening act for several well-known artists on their Japanese concert dates, including Sonic Youth, Beck and Slipknot. Masonna also caught the attention of John Peel and was featured on his program, having even done a limited Masonna John Peel Sessions CD.

Masonna is most known for Yamazaki's wild live performances which usually consist of damaging his equipment, jumping around madly, and at times getting injured.  He has given entire concerts which last only a few seconds. In 1996 Masonna toured the United States on the "American Mystique Tour" named after his album Inner Mind Mystique.

Maso was also the manager of Jojo Hiroshige's Alchemy Music Store until its closure.

Discography

As Masonna
 Shinsen Na Clitoris (1990), Vanilla Records
 Mademoiselle Anne Sanglante Ou Notre Nymphomanie Aureole (1993), Alchemy
 Noskl in Ana (1994), Alchemy
 Super Compact Disc (1995), Alchemy
 Noisextra (1995), RRR
 Ejaculation Generater (1996), Alchemy
 Inner Mind Mystique (1996), Relapse
 Hyper Chaotic (1996), V
 Freak-Out Electrolyze (1997), Nanophonica
 Spectrum Ripper (1998), Cold Spring
 Frequency L.S.D. (1998), Alien8
 Vestal Spacy Ritual (1999), Alchemy
 Beauty Beast (1999), Blast First
 Shock Rock (2002), MIDI Creative

As Flying Testicle
with Merzbow and Zev Asher.
 Lamerican Sextom (1992), ZSF Produkt, Japan, 7"
 Space Desia (1993), Charnel Music, USA, CD

As Space Machine
 Cosmos From Diode Ladder Filter  (2001), Alchemy
 2  (2002), Midi Creative / Noble
 3  (2003), Tiliqua (LP), (2004), Important (CD)

References

Further reading

External links
Yamazaki Maso a.k.a. Masonna official website

South Saturn Delta official site
South Saturn Delta at Cold Spring

1966 births
Living people
Japanese experimental musicians
Noise musicians
Alien8 Recordings artists
Musicians from Kyoto
Musicians from Kyoto Prefecture